Katerina Zakchaiou (born July 26, 1998 in Limassol, Cyprus) is a Cypriot female professional volleyball player, member of the Cyprus women's national volleyball team. At club level, she plays for Italian club Pro Victoria Monza.

Sporting achievements

National Team 
 2016  CEV U19 European Championship - Small Countries Division

Clubs

National championships
 2013/2014  Cypriot Championship, with Apollon Limassol
 2014/2015  Cypriot Championship, with Apollon Limassol
 2015/2016  Cypriot Championship, with Apollon Limassol
 2016/2017  Hellenic Championship Runners up, with Pannaxiakos A.O. Naxos
 2017/2018  Hellenic Championship, with Olympiacos Piraeus
 2018/2019  Hellenic Championship, with Olympiacos Piraeus

National Cups
 2013/2014  Cup of Cyprus, with Apollon Limassol
 2014/2015  Cup of Cyprus, with Apollon Limassol
 2015/2016  Cup of Cyprus, with Apollon Limassol
 2017/2018  Hellenic Cup, with Olympiacos Piraeus
 2018/2019  Hellenic Cup, with Olympiacos Piraeus

National Super Cups
 2013/2014  Super Cup of Cyprus, with Apollon Limassol
 2014/2015  Super Cup of Cyprus, with Apollon Limassol
 2015/2016  Super Cup of Cyprus, with Apollon Limassol

International Cups
 2017/2018  CEV Challenge Cup, with Olympiacos Piraeus

Individuals
 2016 Semi finals of 2016-17 Hellenic Championship Final-four: M.V.P.

References

External links
 Profile at greekvolley.gr 
 Profile at CEV web site
 Interview and brief biografy at www.volleyplanet.gr 
 2016 CEV U19 European Championship Small Countries Division - Women at www.cev.eu
 Katerina Zakchaiou at Olympiacos Piraeus at www.olympiacossfp.gr 

Olympiacos Women's Volleyball players
Cypriot women's volleyball players
Sportspeople from Limassol
1998 births
Living people
Middle blockers
Expatriate volleyball players in Greece
Cypriot expatriates in Greece